Mark Hirsch is an American photographer and publisher based in Platteville Wisconsin. Mark is known for publishing the book, "That Tree", a journal and photo history of the life of an ancient bur oak tree in a farm field in southwest Wisconsin.  Every photograph in the book was taken with an iPhone 4s. Mark's work has been featured on multiple national and international news sources including NPR and CBS Sunday Morning.

Works
 Featured artist ((Voices Gallery))
 Honored and recognized by ((American Grove)), 2015 ((Great American Tree))

References

External links 
 http://www.wptblog.org/tag/mark-hirsch/
 http://arbordayblog.org/favorite-tree-friday/favorite-tree-friday-bur-oak/

1960 births
Living people
People from Platteville, Wisconsin
Writers from Wisconsin